Marlene Taschen is the managing director of Taschen Publishing and the eldest daughter of the founder.

Life and career 
Marlene Taschen is the eldest daughter of Benedikt Taschen, born in Cologne, Germany on 25 September 1985.

Since January 2017, she co-manages Taschen together with her father and has recently become the publishing house's Managing Director. She holds an MSc in Social and Cultural psychology from The London School of Economics and a Bachelor's in Business and Psychology from Kingston University London.  Before joining TASCHEN, she gained extensive international experience living and working in the UK, Panama, and Australia.

Today Marlene divides her time between working from London, where she lives with her partner and young daughter, and from the company's headquarters in Cologne.

References

1985 births
German publishers (people)
Living people
Businesspeople from Cologne